This is a list of Gujarati language television channels.

Government Owned Channel

General Entertainment

Defunct

Movies

Kids

Audio Feeds
Nickelodeon
Nickelodeon Sonic
Sony Yay

News

Gujarati
Lists of television channels in India